Maurice Marie Joseph Vignerot (25 November 1879 in Paris – 28 September 1953 in Gap, Hautes-Alpes) was a French croquet player and Olympic silver medallist. He was beaten to the gold medal by Chrétien Waydelich in Singles, two balls at the 1900 Summer Olympics in Paris. All the contestants in the competition were French. He died at Gap, Hautes-Alpes, France in 1953.

References

External links

French croquet players
Olympic croquet players of France
Croquet players at the 1900 Summer Olympics
Olympic silver medalists for France
1879 births
1953 deaths
Medalists at the 1900 Summer Olympics
Sportspeople from Paris